DR Ultra was a Danish national television channel for children aged 9–14, produced by the public service broadcaster, DR. The channel launched on 4 March 2013, replacing DR Update.

All DR-owned shows for DR Ultra and DR Ramasjang are set in the Danish city of Aarhus.

Logos and identities

March 2013-2017 
At that time, DR Ultra had no logo.

2017-January 2020

External links 
www.dr.dk/ultra

References 

Defunct television channels in Denmark
Television channels and stations established in 2013
Television channels and stations disestablished in 2020